1989 is the 15th studio album by American singer-songwriter Ryan Adams, released digitally through his own PAX AM record label on September 21, 2015. The album is a track-by-track cover of American singer-songwriter Taylor Swift's album of the same name. It debuted at number 7 on the US Billboard 200 chart, one position ahead of Swift's own 1989, which was in its 48th week on the chart.

Background
Adams first became interested in Taylor Swift's album while coping with the collapse of his marriage to Mandy Moore. On what attracted him about Swift's album, Adams stated "There's just a joy to 1989," describing the album as "its own alternate universe". Adams initially described the album as being in the style of the Smiths. When recording the album, Adams said he found a sound somewhere between Bruce Springsteen's Darkness on the Edge of Town and The Smiths' Meat Is Murder.

Taylor Swift's response
On the day that Adams announced the project, Swift responded enthusiastically from her Twitter account, writing, "Cool I'm not gonna be able to sleep tonight or ever again and I'm going to celebrate today every year as a holiday."

Two weeks later, an official statement was released via Entertainment Weekly, whereupon Swift expressed further excitement and anticipation:

On September 21, a day after the album's release, Adams was on Zane Lowe's Beats 1 radio show when Swift made a surprise appearance. Swift praised Adams' work, and described the ways in which his interpretation of the songs differed from her own. She stated that they were "not cover songs" but rather "reimaginings of my songs, and you can tell that he was in a very different place emotionally when he put his spin on them than I was when I wrote them. There's this beautiful aching sadness and longing in this album that doesn’t exist in the original." In the same interview, Swift also admitted that, after spending time listening to an advance copy of Adams' album, she had picked up some of Adams' melodies when performing her songs on tour.

Critical reception

Adams's interpretation of 1989 received mostly positive feedback from music critics. At Metacritic, which assigns a weighted average rating out of 100 from selected independent ratings and reviews from mainstream critics, the album received a metascore of 69 out of 100, based on 25 reviews, indicating "generally favorable reviews."

Entertainment Weeklys Leah Greenblatt praised the album, commenting "If turning the biggest, shiniest pop record of the past year into a survey course in classic rock economy sounds like a novelty, it is. But it's also the best kindone that brings two divergent artists together in smart, unexpected ways, and somehow manages to reveal the best of both of them." Jim Beviglia of American Songwriter also complimented the album, stating "It is 1989 reimagined, with often startling results." On a similar note, The A.V. Clubs Annie Zaleski said of the album in her review: "What his version of 1989 does best is illustrate the strength of the source material. With the radio-ready gloss stripped away, these songs compare to the best moments in Swift's back catalog." Jon Caramanica of The New York Times, however, called the album, "a love letter from an indie idol to a pop queen," and considered Adams "not built for the songs." In a similarly negative review, Mark Richardson of Pitchfork declared, "Adams has transformed [1989] into ... a run-of-the-mill Ryan Adams album." Robert Christgau, writing for Vice, named "This Love" and "I Know Places" as highlights and summed up Adams' cover album with, "Chivalrous Nashville fellow traveler proves the superiority of younger fellow traveler by failing to top much less reinvent a single performance on her breakaway album, which he covers front-to-back like the gifted fanboy I guess he must be".

Accolades

Commercial performance
The album debuted at number 7 on the US Billboard 200, earning 56,000 equivalent album units sales in its first week.

Track listing
All tracks are produced by Ryan Adams and Charlie Stavish.

Personnel
Credits are adapted from liner notes of 1989.

Musicians
 Ryan Adams – vocals, guitars, synthesizer, pump organ, piano, trash can, producer
Taylor Swift – songwriter, original performer
 Stephen Patt – double bass, pedal steel guitar
 The Section Quartet – strings
 Charlie Stavish – bass guitar, synthesizer, producer
 Nate Walcott – piano, organ, pump organ, synthesizer
 Tod Wisenbaker – guitars

Technical
 Andy West Design – design
 Julia Brokaw – band photographs
 Gavin Lurssen – mastering
 Charlie Stavish – engineer, mixing

Charts

Weekly charts

Year-end charts

Release history

References

External links

2015 albums
Ryan Adams albums
Tribute albums
Covers albums
Taylor Swift
PAX AM albums